The 2007 FIBA Under-19 World Championship for Women (Slovak: Majstrovstvá sveta FIBA žien do 19 rokov 2007) was hosted by Slovakia from July 26 until August 5, 2007. Teams played a round robin schedule, with the top four teams of the eighth-final four advancing to the knockout stage.

Overview
The United States won their third title. The other medalists in the tournament were Sweden (silver) and Serbia (bronze). Spain's Marta Xargay was chosen as the tournaments MVP with an average of 15.4 PPG.

Venues
The tournament was played in two venues. It was held at the Inter Hala Pasienky and the Sibamac arena NTC in Bratislava.

Competing nations

FIBA Africa (2)
 
 
FIBA Asia (3)
 
 
 

FIBA Americas (4)
 
 
 
 
FIBA Oceania (1)
 

FIBA Europe (5)
  (Host Nation)

Groups

Preliminary round

Group A

Group B

Group C

Group D

Eighth-final round

Group E

Group F

Knockout stage

Bracket

5th place bracket

9th place bracket

13th place bracket

Quarterfinals

Classification 13–16

Classification 9–12

Classification 5–8

Semifinals

Fifteenth place game

Thirteenth place game

Eleventh place game

Ninth place game

Seventh place game

Fifth place game

Third place game

Final

Statistical leaders

Points

Rebounds

Assists

Blocks

Steals

Final standings

Awards

References

External links 
 FIBA Under-19 World Championship for Women 2007

2007
2007–08 in Slovak basketball
2007 in women's basketball
International women's basketball competitions hosted by Slovakia
2007 in youth sport
July 2007 sports events in Europe
August 2007 sports events in Europe